This is a list of airports in the Winnipeg area of Manitoba, Canada.

See also

List of airports in Manitoba

References

 
Transport in Winnipeg
Winnipeg
Airports
Winnipeg